At the 2011 Pan Arab Games, the archery events were held at Lusail Complex in Doha, Qatar from 12–15 December. A total of 19 events were contested.

Medal summary

Men

Women

Medal table

References

External links
Archery at official website

Pan Arab Games
Events at the 2011 Pan Arab Games
2011 Pan Arab Games